Aydin Yusif oğlu Mammadov (15 February 1932 – 1 November 2022) was a Soviet-Azerbaijani politician. A member of the Communist Party, he served on the Supreme Soviet of the Azerbaijan Soviet Socialist Republic from 1971 to 1990.

Mammadov died on 1 November 2022, at the age of 90.

References

1932 births
2022 deaths
Communist Party of the Soviet Union members
Azerbaijan Technical University alumni
Members of the Supreme Soviet of the Azerbaijan Soviet Socialist Republic
People's commissars and ministers of the Azerbaijan Soviet Socialist Republic
Soviet politicians
Recipients of the Order of the Red Banner of Labour